Bruno Carneiro (born 16 July 1999, in São Paulo) is a Brazilian-American racing driver, the 2019 Asia Formula Renault Vice-Champion, the 2016 China Formula 4 champion, Formula 3, Formula Renault and Lamborghini Super Trofeo.

Career

Karting

Carneiro began karting in 2004, at the age of four. From there he partook in numerous championships across his native Utah.
Multiple Utah Champion in various classes from Kid Karts to Rotax Junior Max from 2005 to 2014.

-2010 Top 10 USA Rotax Grand Nationals Mini Max Class (Legree Motorsports)
-2010 Top 45th Brazilian Karting Championship Super Cadet Class (Raucci Racing)
-2010 Top 10 Trofeo Invernali Ayrton Senna Mini Vortex(DR Karting)
-2010 Top 3 Sul Brasileiro Farroupilha Super Cadet (Waltinho Travaglini Karting)
-2014 Top 15 USA Rotax Grand Nationals JuniorMax Class (Rolison Karting)

Lower Formulas

Carneiro graduated to single-seaters in 2015, competing in the NASA Utah Open Championship and finishing as champion in his first season. He also partook in the fourth round of the China Formula 4 Championship, claiming a fastest lap and a podium in the second race to finish thirteenth in the standings.

iRacing
Bruno Signed with his first eSports Team, Lotema Racing. A portuguese racing team that competes in the highest levels of the iRacing Platform. He has recently joined one of Sim Racings top Esports team, Williams Esport. Carneiro Currently has over 5,400  and is still quickly climbing. His most raced cars on the iRacing service are the Porsche 911 GT3 Cup, Dallara F3, and the GTE and GT3 class cars. Carneiro races and competes amongst the best drivers of sim racing.

FIA Formula 4

In 2016, Carneiro moved to the FIA Chinese F4 series full-time, taking eight victories and the title with wins in Zhuhai, Chengdu, Beijing and Shanghai

Formula 3

In 2017, Carneiro joined the All-Japan Formula Three Championship with the ALBIREX RACING TEAM.

In 2018, Bruno Carneiro continued with the All-Japan Formula Three Championshipwith B-Max Racing/Rodizio Grill/Dallara-Volkswagen. Lack of funding forced Carneiro to quit early in the season, and taking part in only 1 round of the Championship held in Suzuka. He scored two P6 finishes scoring 2 championship points.

Asian Formula Renault

In 2019, Bruno Carneiro joined the Macau-based ART Motorsports(Asian Racing Team) to compete in the 2019 Asian Formula Renault Series driving a Tatuus-Renault 2.0. After 12 race weekends in Zhuhai, China and Sepang, Malaysia, Carneiro finished the season as Vice-Champion, with 2 Wins (Zhuhai & Sepang) Seven P2s, one 3rd, a 4th and one mechanical DNF.

Sports Cars

In 2018, Bruno raced in the Nasa Utah Endurance race with Lamborghini Hurracan Super Trofeo 650 hp. The team, led by Bruno, won the race.

Racing Record

Career summary

* Season still in progress.

Complete F4 Chinese Championship results
(key) (Races in bold indicate pole position) (Races in italics indicate fastest lap)

Complete Japanese Formula 3 Championship results
(key) (Races in bold indicate pole position) (Races in italics indicate fastest lap)

References

External links
 
 
 

1999 births
Living people
People from Salt Lake City
Racing drivers from Utah
Japanese Formula 3 Championship drivers
Asian Formula Renault Challenge drivers
Asia Racing Team drivers
Brazilian racing drivers
American racing drivers
Chinese F4 Championship drivers
B-Max Racing drivers